Hillemacher is a surname. Notable people with the surname include:

Eugène Ernest Hillemacher (1818–1887), French history, portrait and genre painter in the Academic style
Frédéric-Désiré Hillemacher (1811–1886), Belgian engraver
Jeanne Louise Hillemacher (1807-1858)
Paul Hillemacher (1852–1933), French composer and pianist